The Center for Rural Development in Somerset, Kentucky, was established in March 1996. It is a 501(c)(3) nonprofit organization.

The Center aims "to provide leadership that stimulates innovative and sustainable economic development solutions and a better way of life for the citizens we serve". The Center’s programs and services focus on the areas of public safety, arts and culture, leadership, and technology.

History 
The Center was established in Somerset, Kentucky, in March 1996, and became a 501(c)(3) nonprofit organization.  It was the idea of U.S. Congressman from Kentucky Hal Rogers. At the outset it was viewed as a partnership between the state and the University of Kentucky, and it was supported by state and federal funds.

Due to the COVID-19 pandemic, the Center held its programming virtually in 2020. In October 2020, the Center was awarded over $400,000 in grant funding by the Appalachian Regional Commission. In February 2021, it received a $440,400 PPP loan.

Programs

The Center’s programs serve residents in a 45-county area in Southern Kentucky and Eastern Kentucky.

It has a 100,000 square foot meeting and convention facility. The Somerset-Pulaski County Chamber of Commerce meets at the Center.

It provides free youth leadership programs for middle school and high school students. Rogers Scholars is a partnership with 19 colleges and universities. It provides scholarship to students who meet certain academic requirements. The Union College in Barbourville, Kentucky, offers a $1,000 scholarship to all "Rogers Explorers" who attend camp at their location.  The "Entrepreneurial Leadership Institute" (ELI) provides instruction to high school students in how to initiate and manage a business venture.  The students who win the ELI’s Business Concept Competition earn a $16,000 scholarship to Eastern Kentucky University, in Richmond, Kentucky.

The Center's "Displaced Coal Miner Training" program provides technical skills training in 15 career fields for displaced coal miners and former coal employees who were adversely impacted by the region's declining coal industry.

References 

501(c)(3) organizations
Non-profit organizations based in the United States
Public safety
Economic development organizations in the United States
Rural community development
Rural development in the United States
1996 establishments in Kentucky
Somerset, Kentucky
Mining in Kentucky